Aryo Srengat Stadium is a football stadium in the town of Srengat, Blitar, Indonesia. The stadium has a capacity of 6,000 people.

It is the home base of PSBI Blitar.

References

Sports venues in Indonesia
Football venues in Indonesia